A gauge, in science and engineering, is a device used to make measurements or in order to display certain dimensional information. A wide variety of tools exist which serve such functions, ranging from simple pieces of material against which sizes can be measured to complex pieces of machinery. Depending on usage, a gauge can be described as "a device for measuring a physical quantity", for example "to determine thickness, gap in space, diameter of materials, or pressure of flow", or "a device that displays the measurement of a monitored system by the use of a needle or pointer that moves along a calibrated scale".

Basic types
All gauges can be divided into four main types, independent of their actual use.

 Analogue instrument meter with analogue display ("needles"). Until the later decades the most common basic type.
 Digital instrument meter with analogue display. A screen that shows an "analogue meter", commonly used in modern aircraft cockpits, and some hospital equipment etc.
 Digital instrument meter with digital display. Only numbers are shown at a digital display.
 Analogue instrument meter with digital display. Only numbers are displayed, but through a mechanical or electro-mechanical display (today very rare but has existed for clocks, certain Doppler meters and informational screens at many stations and airports)

The two basic types with an analogue display are usually easier for the human eyes and brain to interpret, especially if many instrument meters must be read simultaneously. An indicator or needle indicates the measurement on the gauge. The other two types are only displaying digits, which are more complex for humans to read and interpret. The ultimate example is cockpit instrumentation in aircraft. The flight instruments cannot display figures only, hence even in the most modern "glass-cockpits" where almost all instruments are displayed at screens, few figures are visible. Instead the screens display analogue meters.

More in detail
Various types of gauges include:

References 

Measuring instruments